The term Micronychia may refer to

 Micronychia (plant), a genus of plants in the family Anacardiaceae
 Micronychia (fly), a genus of flies in the family Tachinidae
 abnormally small finger- and toenails